K is the eleventh letter of the Latin alphabet.

K may also refer to:

General uses 
 K (programming language), an array processing language developed by Arthur Whitney and commercialized by Kx Systems
 K (cider), a British draft cider manufactured and distributed by the Gaymer Cider Company of Bath, England
 K band (disambiguation)
 K computer, a Japanese supercomputer
 K-factor (disambiguation), several unrelated terms in physics, engineering, telecommunications and chess
 K (Broadway Brooklyn Local), earlier KK, a defunct service in the New York City Subway discontinued in 1976
 K (Eighth Avenue Local), a defunct service on the New York City Subway, which was known as the AA until 1985
 Vitamin K, a group of vitamins that are needed to promote blood coagulation
 Kappa (Κ) (Greek alphabet)
 Ka (Cyrillic) (К) (Cyrillic alphabet)
 Chrysler K platform, 1981–1995 car design used by Chrysler
 Low-K, the dielectric constant in semiconductors, electronics, and physics
 K–12 education, a designation for the sum of primary and secondary education, used mainly in North America
 K, a prefix for North American call signs used by most broadcast stations in the US west of the Mississippi River
 K College, in Tonbridge, Kent

People
 Adem K, Australian musician
 Yasmin K., German singer
 K (composer), Indian film composer
 K (singer) (born 1983), Korean singer who works in Japan as a J-pop singer
 K, deceased guitarist of Japanese visual kei band Moi Dix Mois

In fiction and literature

Books 
 K (Minogue and Baker book), a photographic book by Kylie Minogue and William Baker
 K, a 2011 novel by Bernardo Kucinski, Brazilian journalist and political scientist
 K. (novel), a 1915 novel by Mary Roberts Rinehart
 "K" Is for Killer, the eleventh novel in Sue Grafton's "Alphabet mystery" series, published in 1994

Films and TV 
 K (2002 film), directed by Shoja Azari, an Iranian American 
 K, a 1997 French film directed by Alexandre Arcady
 K (TV series), a Japanese anime
K, the production code for the 1964 Doctor Who serial The Dalek Invasion of Earth

Characters 
 K, the protagonist of Franz Kafka's 1926 novel The Castle
 K, a character in the manga and anime Gravitation
 K, the main character in the novel by the same name by Bernardo Kucinski
 K, the main character in the TV series Robotto Keiji (Robot Detective)
 K, Todd and Riley's adoptive superspy mother on the Disney program The Replacements
 K, the protagonist played by John Abraham in No Smoking
 K, a character in Natsume Soseki's novel Kokoro
 K, a character in the visual novel Zero Escape: Virtue's Last Reward
 K′, also known as "K Dash" or "K Prime", a King of Fighters character
 Agent K, the character played by Tommy Lee Jones in Men in Black, Men in Black II, and Men in Black 3
 Joseph K., the protagonist of Kafka's 1925 novel, The Trial
 K, the main character in the 2017 film Blade Runner 2049
 Dr. K, the character in Power Rangers RPM

Other 
 K, a constructed language invented by Robert Dessaix

In mathematics 
 K-theory, a branch of topology and algebra
 , in blackboard bold, is a commonly used symbol for a field, as an abbreviation of the German Körper.
 , the complete elliptic integral of the first kind

In music 
 K., abbreviation for Ralph Kirkpatrick’s chronological catalogue of Domenico Scarlatti's keyboard sonatas 
 K., abbreviation for the Köchel catalogue, chronological catalogue of compositions by Wolfgang Amadeus Mozart
 K Records, independent record company based in Olympia, Washington

Albums
 K (album), 1996 album by Kula Shaker

Songs
"K", a song by Cul de Sac (band)
 K, a song by the Japanese rock band Bump of Chicken
  "K" (The Tutts song), 2006 song by The Tutts
"K", a song by The Hold Steady
"K.", a song from Cigarettes After Sex (album) by Cigarettes After Sex

In politics 
 K, the Communist Party (Sweden)
 K, the politics and followers of former President of Argentina Néstor Kirchner (1950-2010)

As a symbol or abbreviation 
 k, from Latin kilo, for 1000 (number) 
 K, ketamine, a street abbreviation for a recreational drug
 K, Kyocera' s mobile phones in Japan
 K, a strikeout in baseball scorekeeping
 K, a contract in legal shorthand
 k, a voiceless velar plosive in the International Phonetic Alphabet
 K, key color (i.e., black) in the CMYK color model, especially for printing 
 k, abbreviation of okay, commonly used in instant messaging, or in S.M.S. messages
 K, the construction point of a ski jumping hill
 k, a shorthand for a knighthood in the British honours system
 K, the ticker symbol on the New York Stock Exchange for the Kellogg Company
K, abbreviation of gridiron football position Kicker (also known as placekicker)

Unit
 k, symbol of the kilo- prefix in the SI and other systems of unit that denotes multiples of 1000
 K, kelvin, the SI unit of thermodynamic temperature
 K (upper case), informal abbreviation for kibibyte or 1024 bytes
 k (lower case), informal abbreviation for kilobyte or 1000 bytes
 k, kilobit (correctly kbit)
 k or K, abbreviation for kilometre (SI symbol: km) (especially in measured-distance sports, e.g. "10K run")
 k or K, abbreviation for kilohm, a measure of resistance in electronics

In the natural sciences
 K, one-letter designation for the amino acid lysine
 K, for carrying capacity of an environment
 K carat (purity), measurement applied to gold
 K, the Cretaceous geological period

In the physical sciences
 Potassium, symbol K, a chemical element
 k, angular wavenumber of a wave
 k, wavevector of a wave
 K, the symbol that represents a kaon in particle physics
 k, the spring constant in Hooke's law relating deformation (strain) and force applied (stress) to a material body
 k or k, the Boltzmann constant, the physical constant relating energy and temperature at the particle level
  or K, relative static permittivity (dielectric constant)
 ke, the Coulomb constant
 K, equilibrium constant 
 k, thermal conductivity
 k, the Gaussian gravitational constant
 k, often used for some proportionality constant

Military and guns
 Kilo, the military time zone code for UTC+10:00
 Operation K, a Japanese World War II naval operation
 The K Project, a series of five nuclear tests by the Soviet Union
 Swedish K, a submachine gun
 AK-47, an assault rifle

Transportation
K (Los Angeles Railway), defunct streetcar line in Los Angeles, California
K (Broadway Brooklyn Local), earlier KK, discontinued in 1976
K (Eighth Avenue Local), a defunct train service on the New York City Subway, which was known as the AA until 1985
K Ingleside (San Francisco Muni)
K Line (Los Angeles Metro)

See also
 K class (disambiguation)
 Circle-k (disambiguation)